EnBW Energie Baden-Württemberg AG, or simply EnBW, is a publicly-traded energy company headquartered in Karlsruhe, Germany. As its name indicates, EnBW is based in the German state of Baden-Württemberg.

History

Foundation and development
EnBW came into being on 1 January 1997 as the result of a merger between two energy companies from Baden-Württemberg, Badenwerk AG and Energie-Versorgung Schwaben AG (EVS). EnBW subsequently merged with Neckarwerke Stuttgart AG on 1 October 2003.

Strategic reorientation and expansion of renewable energy activities
In March 2012, Frank Mastiaux was appointed as the new CEO of EnBW. At the end of 2012, in response to the nuclear power phase-out and the energy transition, Mastiaux announced a strategic reorientation. The proportion of renewable energy sources in EnBW's energy mix was to increase from 12% to 40% by 2020. The figure of 40.1% was reached in 2021. Much of this was to be achieved by expanding wind power: with 1,016 MW onshore and 975 MW offshore, EnBW is now one of the leading wind farm developers and operators in Germany.

Between 2020 and 2025, the company plans to invest over €5 billion in the further expansion of renewable energy generation and aims to operate onshore and offshore wind farms with a total capacity of at least 4,000 MW. EnBW's first offshore wind farm – EnBW Baltic 1, comprising 21 wind turbines in the Baltic Sea – went into operation in 2011. This was followed in early summer 2015 by the 80-turbine EnBW Baltic 2 offshore wind farm, a stake in which had already been sold to Australian investment group Macquarie for €720 million in January 2015. In early 2020, the EnBW Hohe See and Albatros wind farms with a total of 87 turbines and 609 MW capacity went into operation in the North Sea. In 2017, EnBW won bidding for the right to construct its third North Sea wind farm, the 900 MW EnBW He Dreiht, which is unsubsidised and is scheduled for completion in 2025. In January 2019, EnBW acquired seven wind farms in Sweden with a total of 51 turbines and an installed capacity of 105 MW.

EnBW also plans to expand its grids business and make various divestments. An important growth market is Turkey, where EnBW's focus is on hydroelectric power stations and wind farms.

In 2017, EnBW began expanding its electric mobility, photovoltaics and distributed energy generation activities:

In electric mobility, EnBW has collaborated since March 2017 with Tank & Rast, an operator of service areas along the German autobahn network, to expand the provision of charging points for electric vehicles. EnBW provides the EnBW mobility+ app, which combines a charging point locator with payment options and covers Germany, Austria, Switzerland, France, Italy and the Netherlands. According to an independent study by P3, Cirrantic and Theon Data, EnBW has the largest charging network spanning Germany, Austria and Switzerland. In 2020, the company extended its market leadership in fast charging to Austria by entering into a joint venture with SMATRICS called SMATRICS EnBW. In April 2021, EnBW announced plans to open Europe's biggest public fast charging park for electric vehicles by the end of the year.

In photovoltaics and distributed energy generation, EnBW aims to expand photovoltaic generating capacity to 1,200 MWp by 2025, mainly in Germany but also in selected markets elsewhere. In this connection, EnBW is building Germany's largest unsubsidised solar farm with an area of 164 hectares in Brandenburg and in March 2018 acquired Senec, a Leipzig-based manufacturer of home solar battery storage systems.

Internationalisation of renewable energy activities
The EnBW 2025 Strategy includes selective internationalisation of the company's renewable energy activities. EnBW has a presence in Denmark through its subsidiary Connected Wind Services and in Sweden in the form of EnBW Sverige. In June 2019, EnBW completed the acquisition of Valeco, France. The company has a renewable energy joint venture in Turkey in partnership with Borusan. EnBW has also opened offices of its own in Taiwan and the United States in order to bid in offshore wind auctions. Early in 2021, EnBW and BP jointly won an auction for rights to develop offshore wind farms in two adjacent areas of the Irish Sea.

Sports sponsorship
EnBW was the main sponsor of football clubs VfB Stuttgart, and Karlsruher SC for several years until 2010 and continues to sponsor both clubs at a lesser level.

Structure

Shareholders
The two principal shareholders of EnBW are NECKARPRI-Beteiligungsgesellschaft mbH (itself fully owned by the state of Baden-Württemberg) and Oberschwäbische Elektrizitätswerke (OEW, owned by local municipalities), each of which hold a 46.75% ownership interest.

Board of Management

The Board of Management (Vorstand) of the EnBW holding company consists of  Andreas Schell (Chief Executive Officer since 15 November 2022), Colette Rückert-Hennen (Chief Human Resources Officer), Thomas Kusterer (Chief Financial Officer), Dirk Gusewill (Chief Operating Officer Critical Infrastructure) and Georg Stamatelopoulos (Chief Operating Officer Generation).

Figures
EnBW has around 5.5 million customers and is the third-largest energy company in Germany. With a workforce of 26,064, EnBW generated revenue of €32,1 billion in 2021.

Carbon intensity

Facilities

Nuclear power plants 
 Neckarwestheim Nuclear Power Plant (Neckarwestheim 1 decommissioned)
 Obrigheim Nuclear Power Plant (decommissioned)
 Philippsburg Nuclear Power Plant (decommissioned)

Conventional power plants 

 Altbach coal power plant
 Heilbronn coal power plant
 Marbach am Neckar oil power plant  
 Walheim coal power plant 
 Stuttgart-Gaisburg gas power plant 
 Stuttgart-Münster steam power plant (biofuels and coal)
 Rheinhafen-Dampfkraftwerk Karlsruhe coal and gas turbine plant

Renewable energy sources: hydropower 
 Glems (Metzingen) pumped storage plant
 Schluchsee pumped storage plant  
 Rheinfelden (Baden) hydroelectric power plant

Renewable energy sources: offshore wind farms 
 EnBW Baltic 1 Offshore Wind Farm (Baltic Sea, 16 kilometres north of the Darss-Zingst peninsula)
 EnBW Baltic 2 (Baltic Sea, 32 kilometres north of the island of Rügen)
 EnBW Hohe See and Albatros (North Sea; Hohe See approximately 95 kilometres north of the island of Borkum and 100 kilometres northwest of Heligoland; Albatros 105 kilometres from each coast)

Renewable energy sources: onshore wind farms 

Wind farms and wind power projects in Baden-Württemberg:

 Aalen-Waldhausen
 Ahaberg
 Bad Wildbad
 Burgholz
 Bühlertann
 Dünsbach
 Fichtenau
 Goldboden-Winterbach
 Grömbach
 Hasel
 Häusern
 Königsbronn
 Kupferzell-Goggenbach
 Langenburg
 Oppenau/Lautenbach
 Rosenberg Süd
 Rot am See-Hausen am Bach
 Tautschbuch
 Veringenstadt

Wind farms in other German states:
 Auf der weißen Trisch (Saarland)
 Bad Nauheim (Hesse)
 Buchholz III (Lower Saxony)
 Derental (Lower Saxony)
 Eisenbachhöhen (Rhineland-Palatinate)
 Eppenrod (Rhineland-Palatinate)
 Freckenfeld (Rhineland-Palatinate)
 Hüttersdorf (Saarland)
 Kahlberg (Hesse)
 Kannawurf (Thuringia)
 Lauenförde (Lower Saxony)
 Primsbogen (Saarland)
 Reinstädt (Thuringia)
 Schalksmühle (North Rhine-Westphalia)
 Schulenburg III (Lower Saxony)
 Schwienau III (Lower Saxony)
 Silberberg (Hesse)
 Steinheim (North Rhine-Westphalia)
 Webenheim (Saarland)
 Vierherrenwald (Rhineland-Palatinate)

Wind farms in other countries:
 Råmmarehemmet (Sweden)
 EnBW also has stakes in onshore wind farms in France through its subsidiary Valeco

Renewable energy sources: solar power 
Solar farms in operation:
 Aitrach (1.5 MW)
 Berghülen (2.7 MW)
 Birkenfeld (5.8 MW)
 Eggesin (10 MW)
 Ingoldingen (4.3 MW)
 Inzigkofen (7.5 MW)
 Kenzingen (2.6 MW)
 Krautheim (0.5 MW)
 Leibertingen (2.1 MW)
 Leibertingen II (5 MW)
 Leutkirch (5 MW)
 Leutkirch II (2.9 MW)
 Leutkirch III (0.75 MW)
 Lindendorf (6.9 MW)
 Löffingen (2.7 MW)
 March-Neuershausen (0.9 MW)
 Müssentin (9.3 MW)
 Ochsenberg/Königsbronn (10 MW)
 Torgau (4.9 MW)
 Tuningen (4.5 MW)
 Ulm-Eggingen (6.5 MW)
 Zwiefaltendorf (5.2 MW)

Solar farms in development:
 Langenenslingen-Wilflingen
 Maßbach
 Sophienhof
 Ulrichshof
 Weesow-Willmersdorf
 Welgesheim

See also

 Gesellschaft für Nuklear-Service
Responsible Disclosures

References

External links
 
 
 Privacy / Security

 
Electric power companies of Germany
Companies based in Baden-Württemberg
Companies based in Karlsruhe
Companies listed on the Frankfurt Stock Exchange
Energy companies established in 1997
German brands
Government-owned companies of Germany
Government-owned energy companies